Bernard Zadi Zaourou or Bottey Zadi Zaourou (1938 – 20 March 2012) was an Ivorian politician, teacher and writer, minister of culture with Daniel Kablan Duncan in 1993.

Zaourou was born in Soubré.  He was considered as a feminist writer and the theoriser of "DIDIGA" aesthetics

Books 
 Fer de lance, livre I, 1975
 Césarienne (Fer de lance, livre II)
 Aube prochaine
 Les chants du souvenir

Theatre 
 1968 : Sorry Lombe
 1974 : Les sofas et L'œil
 1979 : La tignasse
 1981 : La termitière
 1984 : Le secret des dieux
 1984 : Le Didiga de Dizo
 1985 : La guerre des femmes

External links 

 

1938 births
2012 deaths
Government ministers of Ivory Coast
Ivorian writers
People from Bas-Sassandra District
Ivorian male writers
Culture ministers of Ivory Coast